Lappan is a historic bell tower in the city of Oldenburg, Lower Saxony, Germany.

The tower is the oldest scheduled landmark in Oldenburg. It is 35m high with a Renaissance dome and survived the fire of 1676 in Oldenburg. The tower once belonged to the Holy Spirit Hospital. In 1709, the previous shingle roof was replaced by a copper dome.

See also
 List of visitor attractions in Oldenburg

References

External links

 360° panoramic view next to the tower

Buildings and structures completed in 1467
Towers completed in the 15th century
Buildings and structures in Oldenburg (city)
Tourist attractions in Oldenburg (city)
Towers in Germany
Christian bell towers
Domes
Copper objects
1460s establishments in the Holy Roman Empire
1467 establishments in Europe